Antisemitism in the United States has existed for centuries. In the United States, most Jewish community relations agencies draw distinctions between antisemitism, which is measured in terms of attitudes and behaviors, and the security and status of American Jews, which are both measured by the occurrence of specific incidents. FBI data shows that in every year since 1991, Jews were the most frequent victims of religiously motivated hate crimes, according to a report which was published by the Anti-Defamation League in 2019. Evidence suggests that the true number of hate crimes against Jews is underreported, as is the case for many other targeted groups.

Public opinion surveys paint a mixed picture. According to a survey which was conducted by the Anti-Defamation League in 2019, antisemitism is rejected by a majority of Americans, with 79% of them lauding Jews' cultural contributions to the nation, however, the same poll found that 19% of Americans adhered to the longstanding antisemitic canard that Jews co-control Wall Street, and 31% agreed with the statement "Jewish employers go out of their way to hire other Jews".

American viewpoints on Jews and antisemitism

Roots of American attitudes towards Jews and Jewish history in America

Krefetz (1985) asserts that antisemitism in the 1980s seems "rooted less in religion or contempt and more rooted in envy, jealousy and fear" of Jewish affluence, and the hidden power of "Jewish money". Historically, antisemitic attitudes and rhetoric have tended to increase whenever the United States has faced a serious economic crisis, as well as during moments of political and social uncertainty and fear, such as with the rise of nativist anti-immigration organizing in the early twentieth century, the emergence of the Nazi-affiliated German-American Bund in the 1930s, and the anti-Communist political movement during the Red Scare. Academic David Greenberg has written in Slate, "Extreme anti-communism always contained an antisemitic component: Radical, alien Jews, in their demonology, orchestrated the Communist conspiracy." He also has argued that, in the years which followed World War II, some groups on "the American right remained closely tied to the unvarnished antisemites of the '30s who railed against the 'Jew Deal'", a bigoted term which was used against the New Deal measures of President Franklin D. Roosevelt. American antisemites have viewed the fraudulent text The Protocols of the Elders of Zion as a real reference to a supposed Jewish cabal which was out to subvert and ultimately destroy the U.S. Both the association of Jews with Communism and the fixation on a Jewish cabal purported in The Protocols of the Elders of Zion are conspiracies transplanted to the American context from European modernity: in a moment of economic revolution and socialist politics rising in contexts across Europe, conservative leaders from Christian Russia to interwar Great Britain manipulated a public fear of Jewish Bolshevism to scapegoat Jewish populations for strategic political gain.

The "Great Replacement" theme was stressed by people who highlighted the supposed threat of Jews and other immigrants replacing Americans who were born in the country. In the 1920s and 1930s, antisemitic activists were led by Henry Ford and other figures like Charles Lindbergh, William Dudley Pelley, Charles Coughlin and Gerald L. K. Smith, and some of them were also members of organizations like the America First Committee, the Christian Nationalist Crusade, the German American Bund, the Ku Klux Klan and the Silver Legion of America. They promulgated canards and various interrelated conspiracy theories that widely spread the fear that, through an evil transnational network, Jews were working for the destruction or replacement of white Americans along with the fear that Jews were working for the destruction or replacement of Christianity in the United States.

Stereotypes

The most persistent form of antisemitism has been a series of widely circulating stereotypes that portray Jews as being socially, religiously, and economically unacceptable to American life, because of their inferiority to white Christian society or because of conspiratorial thinking in which Jews are accused of plotting to undermine the racial and economic hierarchies which make up the historical fabric of American society. As a whole, the Jewish people were looked down upon. They were made to feel unwanted, they were marginalized by American society and they were considered a menace to the United States.

Martin Marger wrote, "A set of distinct and consistent negative stereotypes, some of which can be traced as far back as the Middle Ages in Europe, has been applied to Jews."
David Schneder wrote, "Three large clusters of traits are part of the Jewish stereotype (Wuthnow, 1982). First, [American] Jews are seen as being powerful and manipulative. Second, they are accused of dividing their loyalties between the United States and Israel. A third set of traits concerns Jewish materialistic values, aggressiveness, clannishness."

Stereotypes of Jewish people share some of the same content as stereotypes of Asians: perceived disloyalty, power, intelligence, and dishonesty overlap. The similarity between the content of stereotypes of Jews and the content of stereotypes of Asians may stem from the fact that many immigrant Jews and many immigrant Asians both developed a merchant role, a role which was also historically held by many Indians in East Africa, where the content of stereotypes of them resembles the content of stereotypes of Asians and Jews in the United States.

Some of the antisemitic canards which have been cited by the Anti-Defamation League of B'nai B'rith (ADL) in its studies of U.S. social trends include the claims that "Jews have too much power in the business world," "Jews are more willing to use shady practices to get what they want," and "Jews always like to be at the head of things." Another issue that garners attention is the assertion that Jews have an excessive amount of influence on American cinema and news media. Put together, these lines of thinking about Jews demonstrate a common trend in the history of both American and global antisemitism—the inflation of stereotypes of Jews into a theory about how power (politics, economics, media, etc.) functions in society, an irrational theory that deflects responsibility for social ills away from actual authorities and leaders and onto minority Jewish communities.

In contemporary alt-right and right-wing circles, these tropes of power-hungry Jews sometimes manifest through coded references to "globalists," accusations that liberal agendas are the sole product of prominent Jews, and conspiracy theories (such as QAnon) that can be linked to the medieval blood libel against Jews.

Statistics of American viewpoints and analysis
Polls and studies point to a steady decrease in antisemitic attitudes, beliefs, and manifestations among the American public. A 1992 survey by the Anti-Defamation League of B'nai B'rith (ADL) showed that about 20% of Americans—between 30 and 40 million adults—held antisemitic views, a considerable decline from the total of 29% found in 1964. However, another survey by the same organization concerning antisemitic incidents showed that the curve has risen without interruption since 1986.

2005 survey
The number of Americans holding antisemitic views declined markedly six years later when another ADL study classified only 12 percent of the population—between 20 and 25 million adults, as "most antisemitic." Confirming the findings of previous surveys, both studies also found that African Americans were significantly more likely than whites to hold antisemitic views, with 34 percent of blacks classified as "most antisemitic," compared to 9 percent of whites in 1998.
The 2005 Survey of American Attitudes Towards Jews in America, a national poll of 1,600 American adults conducted in March 2005, found that 14% of Americans—or nearly 35 million adults—hold views about Jews that are "unquestionably antisemitic," compared to 17% in 2002, In 1998, the number of Americans with hardcore antisemitic beliefs had dropped to 12% from 20% in 1992.

The 2005 survey found "35 percent of foreign-born Hispanics (down from 44% [in 2002])" and 36 percent of African-Americans hold strong antisemitic beliefs, four times more than the 9 percent for whites." The 2005 Anti-Defamation League survey includes data on Hispanic attitudes, with 29% being most antisemitic (as opposed as 9% for whites and 36% for blacks), being born in the United States helped alleviate that attitude: 35% of foreign-born Hispanics and only 19% of those born in the US.

The survey findings come at a time of increased antisemitic activity in America. The 2004 ADL Audit of Antisemitic Incidents reported that antisemitic incidents reached their highest level in nine years. A total of 1,821 antisemitic incidents were reported in 2004, an increase of 17% over the 1,557 incidents reported during 2003. "What concerns us is that many of the gains we had seen in building a more tolerant and accepting America seem not to have taken hold as firmly as we had hoped," said Abraham H. Foxman, ADL National Director. "While there are many factors at play, the findings suggest that antisemitic beliefs endure and resonate with a substantial segment of the population, nearly 35 million people."

After 2005
In 2007 an ABC News report recounted that past ABC polls across several years have tended to find that about 6% of Americans self-report prejudice against Jews as compared to about 25% being against Arab Americans and about 10% against Hispanic Americans. The report also remarked that a full 34% of Americans reported having "some racist feelings" in general as a self-description.

A 2009 study which was titled "Modern Anti-Semitism and Anti-Israeli Attitudes", published in the Journal of Personality and Social Psychology in 2009, tested a new theoretical model of antisemitism among Americans in the Greater New York area with three experiments. The research team's theoretical model proposed that mortality salience (reminding people that they will someday die) increases antisemitism and that antisemitism is often expressed as anti-Israel attitudes. The first experiment showed that mortality salience led to higher levels of antisemitism and lower levels of support for Israel. The study's methodology was designed to tease out antisemitic attitudes that are concealed by polite people. The second experiment showed that mortality salience caused people to perceive Israel as very important, but did not cause them to perceive any other country this way. The third experiment showed that mortality salience led to a desire to punish Israel for human rights violations but not to a desire to punish Russia or India for identical human rights violations. According to the researchers, their results "suggest that Jews constitute a unique cultural threat to many people's worldviews, that antisemitism causes hostility to Israel, and that hostility to Israel may feed back to increase antisemitism." Furthermore, "those claiming that there is no connection between antisemitism and hostility toward Israel are wrong."

The 2011 Survey of American Attitudes Toward Jews in America released by the ADL found that the recent world economic recession increased some antisemitic viewpoints among Americans. Abraham H. Foxman, the organization's national director, argued, "It is disturbing that with all of the strides we have made in becoming a more tolerant society, antisemitic beliefs continue to hold a vice-grip on a small but not insubstantial segment of the American public." Specifically, the polling found that 19% of Americans answered "probably true" to the assertion that "Jews have too much control/influence on Wall Street" while 15% concurred with the related statement that Jews seem "more willing to use shady practices" in business. Nonetheless, the survey generally reported positive attitudes for most Americans, the majority of those who were surveyed expressed philo-Semitic sentiments such as 64% agreeing that Jews have contributed much to U.S. social culture.

A 2019 survey by the Jewish Electorate Institute found that 73% of American Jews feel less secure since the election of Donald Trump to the presidency. Since 2016, antisemitic attacks against synagogues have contributed to this fear. The survey found that combatting antisemitism is a priority issue in domestic politics among American Jews, including millennials.

Antisemitism within the African-American community

Surveys which were conducted by the ADL in 2007, 2009, 2011, and 2013 all found that the large majority of African-Americans who were questioned rejected antisemitism and expressed the same kinds of generally tolerant viewpoints as other Americans who were also surveyed. For example, their 2009 study reported that 28% of African-Americans surveyed displayed antisemitic views while a 72% majority did not. However, those three surveys all found that negative attitudes towards Jews were stronger among African-Americans than among the general population at large.

According to earlier ADL research, dating back to 1964, the trend that African-Americans are significantly more likely than white Americans to hold antisemitic beliefs across all education levels has remained unchanged over the years. Nonetheless, the percentage of the population which holds a negative opinion of Jews has also waned considerably in the black community during this period. In 1967, New York Times Magazine published the article "Negroes Are Anti-Semitic Because They're Anti-White" in which the African-American author James Baldwin sought to explain the prevalence of black antisemitism. An ADL poll from 1992 stated that 37% of African-Americans surveyed displayed antisemitism; in contrast, a poll from 2011 found that only 29% did so.

Personal backgrounds play a huge role in the lives of people who hold prejudiced versus tolerant views. Among black Americans with no college education, 43% of them fell into the most antisemitic group (versus 18% of the general population) compared to only 27% among blacks with some college education and just 18% among blacks with a four-year college degree (versus 5% of people in the general population with a four-year college degree). The data from the ADL's 1998 polling research showed a clear pattern. Although the 1998 ADL survey found a strong correlation between education level and antisemitism among African Americans, blacks at all educational levels were still more likely than whites to accept anti-Jewish stereotypes.

However, many prominent members of the African-American community have spoken out against antisemitism, including Kareem Abdul-Jabbar and Zach Banner. In December 2022, taking a joint stand against increasing instances of racism and antisemitism in the United States, African-American leaders New York City Mayor Eric Adams, Reverends Al Sharpton and Conrad Tillard, and Vista Equity Partners CEO and Carnegie Hall Chairman Robert F. Smith, joined Jewish leaders Rabbi Shmuley Boteach and Elisha Wiesel, and jointly hosted 15 Days of Light, celebrating Hanukkah and Kwanzaa in a unifying holiday ceremony at Carnegie Hall.  Sharpton said: "There is never a time more needed than now for Blacks and Jews to remember the struggle that we’ve gone through. You can’t fight for anybody if you don’t fight for everybody. I cannot fight for Black rights if I don’t fight for Jewish rights ... because then it becomes a matter of self-aggrandizement rather than fighting for humanity. It’s easy for Blacks to stand up for racism. It’s easy for Jews to stand up to antisemitism. But if you want to really be a leader, you got to speak as a Black against antisemitism and antisemites, and you got to speak as a Jew against racism." Smith said: "When we unify the souls of our two communities, we can usher in light to banish the darkness of racism, bigotry, and antisemitism." 

Prominent African American figures such as Louis Farrakhan and Kanye West have been accused of anti-semitism.

Holocaust denial

Austin App, a German-American La Salle University professor of medieval English literature, is considered the first major American Holocaust denier. App wrote extensively in newspapers and periodicals, and he also wrote a couple of books which detailed his defense of Nazi Germany and Holocaust denial. App's work inspired the Institute for Historical Review, a California center which was founded in 1978 with the sole purpose of denying the Holocaust. One of the newer forms of antisemitism is the denial of the Holocaust by revisionist historians and neo-Nazis.

A survey conducted in 2020 found that close to two-thirds of Millennials and Gen Z adults were not aware that 6 million Jews were killed in the Holocaust. 24% agreed that the Holocaust might be a myth or that accounts of it had been exaggerated.

Antisemitic organizations

White supremacists

There are a number of antisemitic organizations in the United States, some of them violent, which espouse religious antisemitism, racial antisemitism and white supremacy. They include Christian Identity Churches, White Aryan Resistance, the Ku Klux Klan, the American Nazi Party, and many other organizations. Several fundamentalist churches, such as the Westboro Baptist Church and the Faithful Word Baptist Church, also preach antisemitic messages. The largest neo-Nazi organizations in the United States are the National Nazi Party and the National Socialist Movement. Adopting the look and emblems of white power skinheads, many members of these antisemitic groups shave their heads and tattoo themselves with Nazi symbols such as swastikas, SS insignias, and "Heil Hitler". Additionally, antisemitic groups march and preach antisemitic messages throughout America.

Nation of Islam

A number of Jewish organizations, Christian organizations, Muslim organizations, and academics consider the Nation of Islam antisemitic. Specifically, they claim that the Nation of Islam has engaged in revisionist and antisemitic interpretations of the Holocaust and exaggerates the role of Jews in the Atlantic slave trade.

In December 2012, the Simon Wiesenthal Center put the NOI's leader Louis Farrakhan on its list of the ten most prominent antisemites in the world. He was the only American to make it onto the list. The organization cited statements that he had made in October of that year in which he claimed that "Jews control the media" and "Jews are the most violent of people".

Farrakhan has denied charges of antisemitism, but in his denial, he included a reference to "Satanic Jews." After he was banned from Facebook, he stated that those who consider him a hater don't know him personally. However, he admitted that Facebook's designation of him as a "dangerous individual" was correct.

New antisemitism

Antisemitism on college campuses

Many Jewish intellectuals who fled from Nazi Germany after Hitler's rise to power in the 1930s arrived in the United States. There, they hoped to continue their academic careers, but barring a scant few, they found little acceptance in elite institutions in Depression-era America with its undercurrent of antisemitism. Instead, they found work in historically black colleges and universities in the American South.

On April 3, 2006, the U.S. Commission on Civil Rights announced its finding that incidents of antisemitism are a "serious problem" on college campuses throughout the United States. The Commission recommended for the U.S. Department of Education's Office for Civil Rights to protect college students from antisemitism by vigorous enforcement of Title VI of the Civil Rights Act of 1964. It further recommended for the U.S. Congress to clarify that Title VI applies to discrimination against Jewish students.

In February 2015, the Louis D. Brandeis Center for Human Rights under Law and Trinity College presented the results of a national survey of American Jewish college students. The survey had a 10-12% response rate and did not claim to be representative. The report showed that 54% of the 1,157 self-identified Jewish students at 55 campuses nationwide who took part in the online survey reported having experienced or witnessed antisemitism on their campuses during the Spring semester of the last academic year.

A 2017 report by Brandeis University's Steinhardt Social Research Institute indicated that most Jewish students never experience anti-Jewish remarks or physical attacks. The study, "Limits to Hostility," notes that even though it is often reported in the news, actual antisemitic hostility remains rare on most campuses and is seldom encountered by Jewish students. The study attempted to document the student experience at the campus level, adding detail to previous national-level surveys. The report summary highlights the finding that antisemitism exists on campus, but "Jewish students do not think their campus is hostile to Jews."

The National Demographic Survey of American Jewish College Students provided a snapshot of the type, context, and location of antisemitism as it was experienced by a large national sample of Jewish students on university and four-year college campuses. Inside Higher Ed focused on the more surprising findings of the report, like the fact that high rates of antisemitism were also reported at institutions regardless of their location or type, and the data collected after the survey suggests that discrimination occurs during low-level, everyday interpersonal activities, and Jewish students feel that their reports of antisemitism are largely ignored by the administration. However, not all of the reception was positive, and The Forward argued that the study documented only a snapshot in time, rather than a trend; it did not survey a representative sample of Jewish college students; and it was flawed by allowing students to define antisemitism and thus the term open to interpretation.

In September 2021, in collaboration with the Cohen Group, the Brandeis Center conducted a poll of American Jewish fraternity and sorority members. The survey found that more than 65% of the respondents had experienced or were familiar with an antisemitic attack in the previous 120 days. Nearly half of the respondents felt the need to hide their Jewish identity out of fear.

Additionally, the Anti-Defamation League reported that they found 244 antisemitic incidents on college campuses in the 2020-2021 school year, despite the fact that many college campuses were closed during the year due to the Covid-19 pandemic. They estimate that about one-third of all Jewish students experienced antisemitism on college campuses, and 79% of those students reported that happening to them more than once in the academic year. Based on their survey, they found that a significant amount of these antisemitic experiences on campus had to do with Israel, such as assuming that they held a particular viewpoint on Israel because they are Jewish or blaming them for the actions of the Israeli government because they are Jewish, in conjunction with growing anti-Israel and anti-Zionist movements on college campuses.

Sara Fredman Aeder, director of development at NYU Bronfman Center, studied antisemitism on US campuses for her PhD study. She found that most Jewish students had never experienced antisemitism on campus or personally knew of such occurrences. Rather, their fears were informed by what they read online and in social media.

Hate crimes

Overview

In April 2019, the Anti-Defamation League (ADL) reported that antisemitism in the U.S. was at "near-historic levels," with 1,879 attacks recorded against individuals and institutions during 2018, "the third-highest year on record since the ADL started tracking such data in the 1970s."

This followed data from earlier in the decade which showed a multi-year slide in antisemitism, including a 19% decline in 2013.

The Federal Bureau of Investigation (FBI) organizes Uniform Crime Reports (UCR) which are designed to collect and evaluate statistics of offenses which are committed in the U.S. In 2014, 1,140 victims of anti-religious hate crimes were listed, of which 56.8% were motivated by offenders' anti-Jewish biases. 15,494 law enforcement agencies contributed to the UCR analysis.

According to the American Enterprise Institute, Jews were the most likely of any group, religious or otherwise, to be targeted for hate crimes in the U.S. in 2018, 2016, and 2015. The New York Times reported that Jews were the most targeted in proportion to their population size in 2005, and they were the second-most targeted individuals after LGBT individuals in 2014.

The NYPD reported a 75% increase in the amount of swastika graffiti between 2016 and 2018, with an uptick observed after the Pittsburgh shooting. Out of 189 hate crimes in New York City in 2018, 150 featured swastikas. On February 1, 2019, graffiti which read "fucking Jews" was found on the wall of a synagogue in LA. During Hanukkah festivities in December 2019, a number of attacks committed in New York were possibly motivated by antisemitism, including a mass stabbing in Monsey.

In May 2021, there was an upsurge of violent assaults on Jews in the United States at the same time as the Gaza conflict, according to the Secure Community Network and Network Contagion Research Institute.

2018 Pittsburgh synagogue shooting 

The Pittsburgh synagogue shooting was an antisemitic terrorist attack in the form of a mass shooting, which took place at the Tree of Life – Or L'Simcha Congregation synagogue in the Squirrel Hill neighborhood of Pittsburgh, Pennsylvania, United States. The congregation, along with New Light Congregation and Congregation Dor Hadash, which also worshipped in the building, was attacked during Shabbat morning services on October 27, 2018. The perpetrator killed eleven people and wounded six, including several Holocaust survivors. It was the deadliest attack ever on the Jewish community in the United States.

A lone suspect, identified as 46-year-old Robert Gregory Bowers, was shot multiple times by police and arrested at the scene. Bowers had earlier posted antisemitic comments against HIAS (formerly, Hebrew Immigrant Aid Society) on the online alt-tech social network Gab. Dor Hadash had participated in HIAS's National Refugee Shabbat the previous week. Referring to Central American migrant caravans and immigrants, Bowers posted a message on Gab in which he wrote that "HIAS likes to bring invaders in that kill our people. I can't sit by and watch my people get slaughtered. Screw your optics, I'm going in." He has been charged with 63 federal crimes, some of which are capital crimes. He has pleaded not guilty. He separately faces 36 charges in Pennsylvania state court.

2019 Poway synagogue shooting

2019 Jersey City shooting

2022 Colleyville synagogue hostage crisis

2023 Los Angeles shooting
In February 2023, 28 year-old Jaime Tran shot two Jewish men when they were leaving religious services at two separate synagogues in the same predominantly Jewish neighborhood of Los Angeles, California. According to the police, the victims were carried to a hospital in stable condition. Tran was arrested by police and admitted he shot the men for being Jewish. Tran may be sentenced to life in prison.

See also

 Geography of antisemitism#United States
 History of antisemitism#United States
 History of antisemitism in the United States
 History of the Jews in the United States
 List of antisemitic incidents in the United States
 List of attacks on Jewish institutions in the United States
 Antisemitism in the United States in the 21st century
 Racism in the United States#Jewish Americans
 Radical right (United States)
 Religious discrimination in the United States
 United States and the Holocaust
 Israel–United States relations

Notes

References

Further reading
 Buckley, William F. In Search of Anti-Semitism, New York: Continuum, 1992
 Dershowitz, Alan M. Chutzpah 1st ed., Boston: Little, Brown, c1991
 Dinnerstein, Leonard. Antisemitism in America, New York: Oxford University Press, 1994
 Dinnerstein, Leonard Uneasy at Home: Antisemitism and the American Jewish Experience, New York: Columbia University Press, 1987.
Dobkowski, Michael N. The Tarnished Dream: The Basis of American Anti-Semitism (Westport, Conn.: Greenwood Press, 1979, a major scholarly study online
 Dolan, Edward F. Anti-Semitism, New York: F. Watts, 1985.
 Extremism on the Right: A Handbook New revised edition, New York: Anti Defamation League of B'nai B'rith, 1988.
 Flynn, Kevin J. and Gary Gerhardt The Silent Brotherhood: Inside America's Racist Underground, New York: Free Press; London: Collier Macmillan, c1989
 Ginsberg, Benjamin The Fatal Embrace: Jews and the State, Chicago: University of Chicago Press, c1993
 Hate Groups in America: a Record of Bigotry and Violence, New rev. ed. New York: Anti-Defamation League of B'nai B'rith, c1988
 Jaher, Frederic Cople A Scapegoat in the Wilderness: The Origins and Rise of Anti-Semitism in America, Cambridge: Harvard University Press, 1994
 Lang, Susan S. Extremist Groups in America, (New York: F. Watts, 1990).
 Lee, Albert Henry Ford and the Jews, (New York: Stein and Day, 1980).
 Mart, Michelle. "Constructing a universal ideal: anti-Semitism, American Jews, and the founding of Israel." Modern Judaism 20.2 (2000): 181–208.
 Rausch, David A. Fundamentalist-evangelicals and Anti-semitism (Philadelphia: Trinity Press International, 1993).
 Ridgeway, James Blood in the Face: The Ku Klux Klan, Aryan Nations, Nazi Skinheads and the Rise of a New White Culture, (New York: Thunder's Mouth Press, 1990).
 Roth, Philip The Plot Against America, (Boston, MA: Houghton Mifflin, 2004).
 Shapiro, Edward S. "The Approach of War: Congressional Isolationism and Anti-Semitism, 1939–1941." American Jewish History 74.1 (1984): 45–65. online
 Volkman, Ernest A Legacy of Hate: Anti-Semitism in America, New York: F. Watts, 1982

Historiography and memory
 Brackman, Harold David. "The attack on Jewish Hollywood: A chapter in the history of modern American Anti-Semitism." Modern Judaism 20.1 (2000): 1–19.
 Carr, Steven Alan. Hollywood and Anti-Semitism: A Cultural History up to World War II, (Cambridge University Press 2001).
 Dinnerstein, Leonard. "Anti-Semitism exposed and attacked, 1945–1950." American Jewish History 71.1 (1981): 134–149. online
 Gerber, David A. "Leonard Dinnerstein (1934–2019): The Historian and His Subject." American Jewish History 105.1 (2021): 235–245. online
 Goldman, Eric A. "Gentleman's Agreement and Crossfire: Films That Took on Anti-Semitism in 1947 (The 1940s)." in The American Jewish Story through Cinema (University of Texas Press, 2021) pp. 50–96.
 Levinson, Daniel J., and R. Nevitt Sanford. "A scale for the measurement of anti-Semitism." Journal of Psychology 17.2 (1944): 339–370.
 Hirsch, Herbert and Jack D. Spiro, eds. Persistent Prejudice: Perspectives on Anti-Semitism, Fairfax, Va.: George Mason University Press; Lanham, MD: Distributed by arrangement with University Pub. Associates, c1988
 Lipstadt, Deborah E. Denying the Holocaust: The Growing Assault on Truth and Memory, (New York: Free Press; Toronto: Maxwell Macmillan Canada; New York: Maxwell Macmillan International, 1993)
 Short, K. R. M. "Hollywood fights anti-Semitism, 1940-1945." in Film & Radio Propaganda in World War II (Routledge, 2021) pp. 146–172.
 Tobin, Gary A. and Sharon L. Sassler Jewish Perceptions of Antisemitism, New York: Plenum Press, c1988

External links
State of the Nation: Anti-Semitism and the economic crisis by Neil Malhotra and Yotam Margalit in Boston Review

 
Jews and Judaism in the United States